Wall of Noise is a 1963 American drama film directed by Richard Wilson, written by Joseph Landon, and starring Suzanne Pleshette, Ty Hardin, Dorothy Provine, Ralph Meeker, Simon Oakland and Jimmy Murphy. It was released by Warner Bros. on September 4, 1963.

Plot
A horse trainer, Joel Tarrant, needs a job and is hired by Matt Rubio, a wealthy building contractor. Joel has a girlfriend, Ann, but is tempted by the advances of Rubio's seductive wife, Laura.

Laura knows there is a horse Joel feels can become a champion and persuades him to buy it. He borrows money from Johnny Papadakis to do so, but the horse is injured and Rubio fires him after recognizing the relationship between his wife and Joel, who is unable to repay Papadakis his debt.

Ann goes to great lengths to help him out of trouble, even offering herself to Papadakis as a form of payment. But after Papadakis dies unexpectedly, Joel and Ann return to their lives, looking after their recovering horse.

Cast  
 Suzanne Pleshette as Laura Rubio
 Ty Hardin as Joel Tarrant
 Dorothy Provine as	Ann Conroy
 Ralph Meeker as Matt Rubio
 Simon Oakland as Johnny Papadakis
 Jimmy Murphy as Bud Kelsey
 Murray Matheson as Jack Matlock
 Robert F. Simon as Dave McRaab
 George O. Petrie as Mr. Harrington
 Jean Byron as Mrs. Harrington
 Fred Carson as Adam Kasper
 William "Bill" Walker as Money
 Napoleon Whiting as Preacher
 Kitty White as Singer
 Roy Engel as Vet

See also
 List of American films of 1963

References

External links 
 
 
 
 

1963 films
Warner Bros. films
American drama films
1963 drama films
Films scored by William Lava
Films directed by Richard Wilson (director)
1960s English-language films
1960s American films